Belchamp Otten is a village and civil parish in Essex, England. It is near Belchamp St Paul and Belchamp Walter. The village is in the district of Braintree and in the parliamentary constituency of Braintree. The parish is part of the Stour Valley North parish cluster 

It has a population of 164 (2011 census).

References

External links

Villages in Essex
Braintree District